Altungulata or Pantomesaxonia (sensu  and later authors) is an invalid clade (mirorder) of ungulate mammals comprising the perissodactyls, hyracoids, and tethytheres (sirenians, proboscideans, and related extinct taxa).

Both names are still in use, and, to add to the confusion, various authors assign different ranks to the involved taxa.

Altungulata is not supported by molecular evidence unless perissodactyls are excluded (thus dividing Altungulata into Laurasiatheria and Afrotheria), and the validity of the following uniting synapomorphies remain disputed:
 bilophodonty, two lophs or crests running transversally across the crown of the tooth
 large third molars
 molarization of posterior premolars
 elongated thoracic region with at least 19 vertebrae
 clavicle absent
 similar development of fetal membranes

Recent studies on Abdounodus showcase that dental synapomorphies between both groups arose independently, further discrediting the Altungulata hypothesis.

Classification
Paenungulata together with Macroscelidea, Tubulidentata, and the lipotyphlan families Tenrecidae and Chrysochloridae compose Afrotheria. With the exclusion of the better known Radinskya and Minchenella from Phenacolophidae, their affinities to Embrithropoda are suspect, and they were regarded as Altungulata incertae sedis by Mao et al. (2015).

Altungulata Prothero and Schoch 1989
 †Radinskya, 
 †Olbitherium
 †Phenacolophidae Zhang 1978
 †Ganolophus Zhang 1979
 †Phenacolophus Matthew and Granger 1925 (= Procoryphodon Flerow 1957)
 †Sanshuilophus Mao et al. 2015
 †Tieshanilophus Tong 1979
 †Yuelophus Zhang 1978
 †Zaisanolophus Gabunia 1998
 Order Perissodactyla
 Suborder Hippomorpha
 Superfamily Equoidea
 Equidae
 †Palaeotheriidae
 Suborder Tapiromorpha
 †Isectolophidae
 Infraorder Ceratomorpha
 Superfamily Tapiroidea
 †Helaletidae
 †Deperetellidae
 †Lophialetidae
 Tapiridae
 Superfamily Rhinocerotoidea
 †Hyrachyidae (Hyracodontidae?)
 †Hyracodontidae
 †Amynodontidae (Rhinocerotidae?)
 Rhinocerotidae
 Infraorder †Ancylopoda
 †Eomoropidae
 †Chalicotheriidae
 †Lophiodontidae (Tapiroidea?)
 Suborder †Titanotheriomorpha
 Superfamily †Brontotherioidea
 †Brontotheriidae (equoids)
 †Anchilophidae (palaeotheriid equoids?)
 Order Paenungulata (=Uranotheria)
 Suborder Hyracoidea (sister taxon of Perissodactyla?)
 †Pliohyracidae
 Procaviidae
 Suborder Tethytheria
 Infraorder †Embrithopoda
 †Arsinoitheriidae
 Infraorder Sirenia
 †Prorastomidae
 †Protosirenidae (Dugongidae?)
 Dugongidae
 Trichechidae
 Infraorder †Desmostylia
 †Desmostylidae
Infraorder Proboscidea
 †Anthracobunidae (tethytheres?)
 †Phosphatheriidae (Numidotheriidae?)
 †Numidotheriidae
 †Moeritheriidae
 †Barytheriidae
 †Deinotheriidae
 †Palaeomastodontidae
 †Phiomiidae
 †Hemimastodontidae
 †Mammutidae
 †Gomphotheriidae
 Elephantidae

See also
 Mammal classification

Notes

References

 
 
 
 
 
 
 

Obsolete mammal taxa